Ferlito is an Italian family name, and may refer to:

Carlotta Ferlito (born 1995), Italian gymnast
Giuseppe Ferlito (born 1954), Italian film director
Vanessa Ferlito (born 1980), American actress

See also
Team Ferlito, an Italian auto racing team

Italian-language surnames